The Old Barn is a 1929 American comedy film directed by Mack Sennett.

Plot 
A motley collection of guests and regulars at a country hotel are anxious one dark and stormy night when they hear by a radio news bulletin that a dangerous criminal has just broke jail and is headed their way. A surly mystery man answering the description shows up, and then hides out in a nearby barn.

Cast 
Johnny Burke
Thelma Hill
Daphne Pollard
Andy Clyde
Irving Bacon
Vernon Dent
Dave Morris
Ruth Kane

External links 

1929 films
1929 comedy films
Mack Sennett Comedies short films
American black-and-white films
1920s English-language films
Silent American comedy films
American comedy short films
Films directed by Mack Sennett
1920s American films